The Corliss–Carrington House is a National Historic Landmark house at 66 Williams Street in the College Hill neighborhood of Providence, Rhode Island.  Built in 1812, it is significant as a high-quality and well-preserved example of an Adamesque-Federal style town house.

Description
The house is a large three-story brick structure, trimmed in brownstone.  The front facade is five bays wide, with corners trimmed with brownstone quoining.  The window bays are also lined with quoining and topped by flat-arch brownstone with keystones.  The center three bays of the front facade are sheltered by a two-story porch, supported on the first floor by fluted cast iron Corinthian columns, and on the second by fluted wooden Ionic columns.  The main entrance is flanked by sidelight windows and topped by an elliptical fanlight.

The interior follows a typical Federal plan, with an expansive central hallway flanked by two rooms on each side.  An archway with a leaded fanlight separates the immediate entry area from the spiral staircase that provides access to the second floor.  The parlor to the right of the entry is the finest chamber, decorated with original Chinese-style wallpaper and elaborate woodwork, said to be the design of John Holden Greene.  The fireplace mantels in this and other first-floor rooms are all Greek Revival replacements.

History
The house was built in 1810–11 by John Corliss, a prominent Providence businessman, and was originally two stories in height. In 1812 it was purchased by Edward Carrington, who added the third floor and the front porch. The house remained in the Carrington family until 1936, when it was given to the Rhode Island School of Design. It was sold by the school to private owners in 1961, and is not open to the public.

It was declared a National Historic Landmark and listed on the National Register of Historic Places in 1970.

On December 17, 2019, Rhode Island Businessman and former mayoral candidate, Lorne Adrain, announced the purchase of the home for use as the headquarters of his program "Global Fellows in Courage".

See also

List of National Historic Landmarks in Rhode Island
National Register of Historic Places listings in Providence, Rhode Island

References

Images

Houses on the National Register of Historic Places in Rhode Island
Houses in Providence, Rhode Island
National Historic Landmarks in Rhode Island
Houses completed in 1812
Historic district contributing properties in Rhode Island
National Register of Historic Places in Providence, Rhode Island
Federal architecture in Rhode Island